Alexander Billmeyer (January 7, 1841 – May 24, 1924) was a Democratic member of the U.S. House of Representatives from Pennsylvania.

Alexander Billmeyer was born in Liberty Township, Pennsylvania.  He was engaged in agricultural pursuits and the manufacture of lumber.  He worked as director of a national bank in Washingtonville, Pennsylvania.

Billmeyer was elected as a Democrat to the Fifty-seventh Congress to fill the vacancy caused by the death of Rufus K. Polk.  He was not a candidate for renomination in 1902.  He resumed agricultural pursuits in Montour County, Pennsylvania, and died near Washingtonville in 1924.  Interment was in Odd Fellows Cemetery in Danville, Pennsylvania.

Sources

The Political Graveyard

1841 births
1924 deaths
People from Montour County, Pennsylvania
Democratic Party members of the United States House of Representatives from Pennsylvania